Etorphine (M99)  is a semi-synthetic opioid possessing an analgesic potency approximately 1,000–3,000 times that of morphine. It was first prepared in 1960 from oripavine, which does not generally occur in opium poppy extract but rather the related plants Papaver orientale and Papaver bracteatum. It was later reproduced in 1963 by a research group at MacFarlan Smith in Gorgie, Edinburgh, led by Kenneth Bentley. It can also be produced from thebaine.

Veterinary use 
Etorphine is available legally only for veterinary use and is strictly governed by law. It is often used to immobilize elephants and other large mammals. Diprenorphine (Revivon) is an opioid receptor antagonist that can be administered in proportion to the amount of etorphine used (1.3 times) to reverse its effects. Veterinary-strength etorphine is fatal to humans. For this reason the package as supplied to vets always includes the human antidote along with the etorphine.

The human antidote is generally naloxone, not diprenorphine, and is always prepared before the preparation of etorphine to be immediately administered following accidental human exposure to etorphine. The  in humans is 30 μg which led to the requirement that the medicine include an equal dose of an antidote, diprenorphine or naloxone.

One of its main advantages is its speed of operation, and more importantly, the speed that diprenorphine reverses its effects. The high incidence of side effects, including severe cardiopulmonary depression,  has caused etorphine to fall into disfavor in general veterinary practice.  However, its high potency, combined with the rapid action of both etorphine and its antagonist, diprenorphine, means that it has found a place for use in the capture of large mammals such as rhinoceroses and elephants, where rapid onset and rapid recovery are both very important. The high potency of etorphine means that sufficient etorphine can be administered to large wild mammals by projectile syringe (dart).

Large Animal Immobilon is a combination of etorphine plus acepromazine maleate. An etorphine antidote Large Animal Revivon contains mainly diprenorphine for animals and a human-specific naloxone-based antidote, which should be prepared prior to the etorphine. A 5–15 mg dose is enough to immobilize an African elephant and a 2–4 mg dose is enough to immobilize a black rhinoceros.

Pharmacology 
Etorphine is an extremely potent, non-selective full agonist of the μ-, δ-, and κ-opioid receptors. It also has relatively weak affinity for the nociceptin receptor. Etorphine has an LD50 of 30 μg in humans.

Legal status 
In Hong Kong, etorphine is regulated under Schedule 1 of Hong Kong's Chapter 134 Dangerous Drugs Ordinance. It can be used legally only by health professionals and for university research purposes. The substance can be given by pharmacists under a prescription. Anyone who supplies the substance without prescription can be fined $10,000 (HKD). The penalty for trafficking or manufacturing the substance is a $5,000,000 (HKD) fine and life imprisonment. Possession of the substance for consumption without license from the Department of Health is illegal with a $1,000,000 (HKD) fine and/or 7 years of jail time.

In the Netherlands, etorphine is a Schedule I drug of the Opium Law. It is used only for veterinary purposes in zoos to immobilize large animals.

In the US, etorphine is listed as a Schedule I drug with an ACSCN of 9056, although its hydrochloride salt is classified as Schedule II with an ACSCN of 9059.  For both, the 2013 annual aggregate manufacturing quota for both was zero so presumably veterinary supplies of the hydrochloride are imported from Germany and/or the UK. 

In the UK, under the Misuse of Drugs Act 1971, etorphine is controlled as a Class A substance.

In Italy Etorphine is illegal, as are the parent compounds  Dihydroetorphine and Acetorphine. (Datas from 2022)

See also 
 6,14-Endoethenotetrahydrooripavine - the central nucleus of all Bentley compound opioids under which class etorphine falls
 Dihydroetorphine – a close analog of etorphine that has been used as an opioid painkiller for human usage in China
 Thienorphine
 Opioid potency comparison

References

External links 
 Opioids.com page on etorphine
 Etorphine: Molecule of the Month

Analgesics
Delta-opioid receptor agonists
4,5-Epoxymorphinans
Ethers
Semisynthetic opioids
Kappa-opioid receptor agonists
Mu-opioid receptor agonists
Nociceptin receptor agonists
Phenols
Tertiary alcohols